Shigi Qutuqu was a high-ranking minister of the Mongol Empire in its early years and a stepbrother of Genghis Khan, the empire's founder.

Life
According to The Secret History of the Mongols, Shigi Qutuqu was a son of a Tatar nobleman. As a child, he was lost during a skirmish between the Mongols and the Tatars in the early 1190s and was discovered by Genghis Khan's men later. He was brought to the khan's mother, Hoelun, and was adopted by her as a son.

Shigi Qutuqu was well-versed in legal affairs and contributed greatly to the Mongolian legal code of Yassa during the early years of the Mongol Empire. He was appointed by Genghis Khan as a judge in 1206 and helped to keep a record of legislations and criminal affairs as part of his duties. He also maintained a close friendship with Yelü Chucai, the prime minister of the Mongol Empire.

In 1221, Shigi Qutuqu led the Mongolian army at the Battle of Parwan against the Khwarezmid Empire, which was led by Sultan Jalal ad-Din Mingburnu. It marked one of the few defeats of the Mongols by the Khwarezmians. Shigi Qutuqu joined Genghis Khan at the Battle of the Indus. Then he was sent to Nishapur with Tolun Cherbi, half-brother of Genghis khan. Following his mission in Nishapur, Shigi Qutuqu was appointed the charge of the captive craftsmen in Ghazni who were to be transported into Mongolia. Finishing his mission in Ghazni, Shikhikhutug leaded the siege of Tulak of which the governor Hashabi Nizawar agreed to pay tributes. After annexing Tulak, Shigi Qutuqu dealt with the revolt that dethroned the Pro-Mongol governance of Merv.

Shigi Qutuqu was appointed by Ögedei Khan as a chief judge in northern China in 1240 and died in 1250.

There are legends that he was one of the authors of the Secret History of the Mongols.

References
Secret History of the Mongols

Mongol Empire people
1250 deaths
Year of birth unknown